Love and Paranoia is the sixth studio album by Australian rock band Regurgitator. It was released in Australia on 15 September 2007 and was inspired by 1980s rock. As the album's title track suggests, several songs are unguardedly romantic, while others touch on the paranoia, fear and resulting insularity in these politically conservative days. The majority of the album was recorded mid-2007 in Brazil. The album is also the first to feature new member Seja Vogel who provides keyboards and vocals.

Track listing
"Blood and Spunk" (Q. Yeomans) – 3:01
"Drinking Beer is Awesome!" (B. Ely) – 2:10
"Romance of the Damned" (S. Vogel/Q. Yeomans) – 3:20
"Love and Paranoia" (Q. Yeomans) – 3:51
"Hurricane" (B. Ely) – 2:02
"Destroy This Town" (Q. Yeomans) – 3:19
"Psychic Dirt" (B. Ely) – 3:05
"Sun Comes Thru My Window" (B. Ely) – 0:42
"(Ad Spot)" (Q. Yeomans) – 0:36
"Magnetic" (S. Vogel) – 2:54
"Michelle" (Q. Yeomans) – 2:39
"Armageddon Premonition" (B. Ely) – 4:03

Charts

Release history

References

Regurgitator albums
2007 albums